Hässelby strand is a district within the borough of Hässelby-Vällingby in the west of the city of Stockholm, Sweden. It lies on the shores of Lake Mälaren.

The district is served by Hässelby strand station, the north-western terminus of the Green line of the Stockholm metro.

Districts in Västerort